Yang Fang (born July 3, 1984 in Qiqihar, Heilongjiang) is a Chinese ice dancer. She competed with Gao Chongbo as her partner. They were the 2001 & 2003-2005 Chinese national champions. Their highest placement at an ISU championship was 6th at the 2004 Four Continents Championships.

Results
(with Gao)

External links
 

1984 births
Living people
Chinese female ice dancers
Sportspeople from Qiqihar
Figure skaters at the 2003 Asian Winter Games
Figure skaters from Heilongjiang